Sabayon may refer to:

Zabaione (also spelled "sabayon"), an Italian dessert
Sabayon Linux, a computer operating system